John August Anderson (August 7, 1876 – December 2, 1959) was an American astronomer. He was born in Rollag, a small community in Clay County, Minnesota to the south of Hawley.

Biography
Anderson received his Ph.D. at Johns Hopkins University in 1907, and remained on the staff after graduation. In 1908, he became professor of astronomy at the university. In 1909, he was also given the responsibility for the Rowland ruling engines that were used for creating diffraction gratings, and the quality of these was considered excellent, especially the concave gratings.

In 1916, he left to work at the Mt. Wilson observatory. He remained on the Mt. Wilson staff until 1956. His most notable contribution was his adaptation of the Michelson's interferometer technique for measuring close double stars. He used a rotating mask at the focus to measure the separation of Capella.

From 1928 until 1948, he was Executive Officer of the Caltech Observatory Council, working on the instrument and optical design of the main Palomar Observatory telescope. During this period he collaborated closely with George E. Hale and the Rockefeller Foundation.

He died at the age of 83 in Altadena, California. The crater Anderson on the Moon is named in his memory.

He was awarded the Franklin Institute's Howard N. Potts Medal in 1924.

Bibliography
Unless otherwise noted, the following publications were by John A. Anderson.
 "On the Application of the Laws of Refraction in Interpreting Solar Phenomena", Astrophysical Journal, vol. 31, 1910.
 "A method of investigating the Stark effect for metals, with results for chromium", 1917.
 "The vacuum spark spectrum of calcium", 1924.
 "The Use of Long Focus Concave Gratings at Eclipses", Publications of the Astronomical Society of the Pacific, Vol. 38, 1926.
 J. A. Anderson and Russell W. Porter, "Ronchi's Method of Optical Testing", Astrophysical Journal, vol. 70, 1929.
 "Spectral energy-distribution of the high-current vacuum tube", 1932.
 "On the application of Michelson's interferometer method to the measurement of close double stars", Astrophysical Journal, vol. 51, June 1920.
 "Optics of the 200-inch Hale Telescope", Publications of the Astronomical Society of the Pacific, Vol. 60, 1948.

References

1876 births
1959 deaths
American astronomers
Johns Hopkins University alumni
Johns Hopkins University faculty
Members of the United States National Academy of Sciences